Chris Fagan may refer to:

 Chris Fagan (coach) (born 1961), coach of the Brisbane Lions
 Chris Fagan (Irish footballer) (born 1989), Irish footballer for St Pat's Athletic
 Kit Fagan (Chris Fagan, born 1950), English football defender